USS Babbitt (DD–128) was a  in the United States Navy during World War I and World War II, later classified as AG-102. She was named for Fitz Babbitt. As of 2010, no other ship in the United States Navy has borne this name.

Construction and commissioning

Babbitt was launched on 30 September 1918 at New York Shipbuilding Corporation, Camden, New Jersey, sponsored by Miss Lucile Burlin. The destroyer was commissioned on 24 October 1919, Commander William E. Eberle in command, and reported to the Pacific Fleet.

Service history
Babbitt served with the Pacific Fleet on maneuvers and exercises until going out of commission at San Diego on 15 June 1922. Upon recommissioning on 4 April 1930, Babbitt reported to the Pacific Fleet and served along the west coast until February 1931, when she proceeded to the Atlantic Ocean. Between February 1931 and May 1932, she operated with Destroyer Squadron, Scouting Force, along the eastern seaboard, in the West Indies, the Gulf of Mexico, and in the Panama Canal Zone. During May 1932 to April 1933, Babbitt served at the Naval Torpedo Station, Newport, and made a cruise to Chile conducting exercises with experimental torpedoes. She was assigned to Rotating Reserve Destroyer Squadron 19 at Norfolk between 25 May and 20 October 1933, and then assumed reduced commission status until January 1935. While in this status, she operated with the Training Squadron, Scouting Force, training reserves.

For a brief period between January and May 1935, she returned to Rotating Reserve Destroyer Squadron 19. Placed in full commission 15 May 1935, Babbitt served with the Midshipmen's Coastal Cruise Detachment and then, for two years, with the Special Service Squadron in the Cuban-Puerto Rican area. In April 1939, she participated in the opening of the New York World's Fair. Subsequently, she was attached to Destroyer Squadron 27 Patrol Force, on Neutrality Patrol and convoy escort duty along the Atlantic and Caribbean coastlines.

World War II
Babbitt operated as a convoy escort in the waters off Iceland, along the east and gulf coasts of the United States and in the Caribbean Sea. Between 10 March 1943 and 21 March 1944, she also completed five trans-Atlantic escort crossings one to England and four to North Africa.

Convoys escorted

Auxiliary service
On 2 February 1945, Babbitt reported to the Underwater Sound Laboratory, New London, Connecticut, for experimental sonar work. On 10 June 1945, her classification was changed to AG-102. She remained on experimental duty until December 1945, when she entered New York Navy Yard for pre-inactivation overhaul. Babbitt was decommissioned on 25 January 1946 and sold on 5 June 1946.

Awards
 American Defense Service Medal
 European–African–Middle Eastern Campaign Medal with one battle star for World War II service
 World War II Victory Medal

Babbitt received her battle star for the escort of Convoy SC 121.

References

Bibliography

External links
 NavSource Photos

Wickes-class destroyers
World War II destroyers of the United States
World War II auxiliary ships of the United States
Ships built by New York Shipbuilding Corporation
1918 ships